Augustín Čisár is a Slovak diplomat and the Ambassador Extraordinary and Plenipotentiary of the Slovak Republic to the Russian Federation.

References 

Slovak diplomats
Year of birth missing (living people)
Living people
Ambassadors of Slovakia to Russia